Jean Despres (1903–1988) was a perfume industry businessman, known for his work with Coty, Inc.

The French-born Jean Despres came to New York in 1921 working for Coty Inc. Starting as a shipping clerk, he went on to become a travelling salesman, covering thousands of miles on the Santa Fe Railroad across America to sell Coty perfumes and gift sets.  He soon became a sales manager, and in 1942 was appointed Executive Vice President of Coty, Inc.  He held this position for more than 25 years when Pfizer purchased Coty in 1968. 

Coty, Inc., was a French perfume company created by wealthy François Coty, proprietor of Le Figaro, the French daily newspaper headquartered on the Champs-Élysées in Paris, France and owner of numerous chateaux and villas in France and Corsica. Coty died in 1934.   Jean Despres led Coty in New York with Philippe Cortney, brother-in-law of Mrs.Coty-Cotnareanu. He founded the Fragrance Foundation in New York, for the perfume industry, serving as its president. When he retired he appointed Anette Greene. He was a founder of the Toilet Goods Association Inc., Washington, D.C. and served as its president in the 1960s, attending its annual meetings until 1987, a year before his death. 

With the expansion of department stores in the 1930s and 1940s, he created "in-store" displays and "in-store" merchandising staff, which evolved into the cosmetics counters of today.

He was a founding member of the Coty American Fashion Critics' Awards, along with Grover Whalen, created to encourage and honor American talent and American fashion designers.  The awards presentation ceremony initially took place at the Metropolitan Club (where he was a member for 50 years) subsequently moved to  the Metropolitan Museum of Art and eventually held at Alice Tully Hall, Lincoln Center. He joined the New York Athletic Club when it opened in 1924, was a director of the French Hospital in New York City, of Coty International, the French-American Chamber of Commerce, Compagnie de St. Gobain and Lilly Dache, Inc., a Chevalier of the Confrerie des Chevaliers de Tastevin, and resident of New York City, Pound Ridge, NY, Delray Beach, Florida and Meudon, France. In the 1940s he became an American Citizen. 

Despres married milliner and fashion designer Lilly Daché in Palm Beach, Florida on March 13, 1931, a happy, loving  marriage for more than 53 years. His grandson, John Gordon Gauld, is a New York and Massachusetts artist. Daughter, Suzanne Dache, continues the Dache businesses.

References

External links
 Jean Desprez on Fragrantica
 Coty, Inc.
 Pfizer, Inc.

1903 births
1988 deaths
French cosmetics businesspeople
History of cosmetics
French emigrants to the United States